The Education & Skills Select Committee was a Committee of the House of Commons in the Parliament of the United Kingdom. The official name was the House of Commons, Education and Skills Committee.

The committee was abolished as a result of the abolition of the Department for Education and Skills, whose responsibilities were split between the new Department for Children, Schools and Families and the new Department for Innovation, Universities and Skills. Committees were subsequently set up in line with the new departments.

Remit

The Education and Skills Committee was one of the House of Commons Select committees related to government departments: its terms of reference were to examine "the expenditure, administration and policy of the Department for Education and Skills and its associated public bodies".

The Committee chooses its own subjects of inquiry, within the overall terms of reference. It invited written evidence from interested parties and held public evidence sessions, usually in committee rooms at the House of Commons, although it did have the power to meet away from Westminster.

At the end of each inquiry, the Committee would normally agree a Report based on the evidence received. Such reports were published and made available on the internet. Reports usually contained recommendations to the Government and other bodies. The Government by convention responded to reports within about two months of publication. These responses were also published.

Inquiries

The Committee could examine any area of work related to the Department for Education and Skills and its associated public bodies, such as the Learning and Skills Council and Ofsted.

The inquiries that the committee carried out included:

 Bullying
 Citizenship education
 Prison education
 Further education
 Special Educational Needs
 Secondary education
 Teaching children to read

See also
List of Committees of the United Kingdom Parliament

External links
 Education & Skills Committee
Records for this Committee are held at the Parliamentary Archives

Defunct Select Committees of the British House of Commons